NGC 1270 is an elliptical galaxy located about 250 million light-years away in the constellation Perseus. It was discovered by astronomer Heinrich d'Arrest on February 14, 1863. NGC 1270 is a member of the Perseus Cluster and has an estimated age of about 11 billion years. However, Greene et al. puts the age of NGC 1270 at about 15.0 ± 0.50 Gy.

NGC 1270 has a supermassive black hole with an estimated mass of no more than 12 billion solar masses.

Activity
Spectroscopy of NGC 1270 suggests that the galaxy contains a low-luminosity AGN (LLAGN).

See also
 List of NGC objects (1001–2000)
 NGC 1277
 NGC 1271

References

External links

 http://instrumentation.tamu.edu/publications/REU/KinematicsREU2015.pdf

Perseus Cluster
Perseus (constellation)
Elliptical galaxies
1270
12350
Astronomical objects discovered in 1863
2643
Active galaxies
Discoveries by Heinrich Louis d'Arrest